Father's Day is a holiday of honoring fatherhood and paternal bonds, as well as the influence of fathers in society. In Catholic countries of Europe, it has been celebrated on 19 March as Saint Joseph's Day since the Middle Ages. In the United States, Father's Day was founded by Sonora Smart Dodd, and celebrated on the third Sunday of June for the first time in 1910. The day is held on various dates across the world, and different regions maintain their own traditions of honoring fatherhood. Sikhs celebrate Father's Day (ਪਿਤਾ ਦਿਵਸ) on 29 December, Birthday of Guru Gobind Singh.

Father's Day is a recognized public holiday in Lithuania and some parts of Spain and was regarded as such in Italy until 1977. It is a national holiday in Estonia, Samoa, and equivalently in South Korea, where it is celebrated as Parents' Day. The holiday complements similar celebrations honoring family members, such as Mother's Day, Siblings Day, and Grandparents' Day.

History

Early history
For centuries, the Eastern Orthodox Church has appointed the second Sunday before Nativity as the Sunday of the Forefathers to commemorate the ancestors of Christ according to the flesh, starting with Adam and emphasizing the Patriarch Abraham, to whom God said,

This feast can fall between 11 and 17 December.  This feast includes the ancestors of the Mary, mother of Jesus and various prophets.

A customary day for the celebration of fatherhood in Catholic Europe is known to date back to at least 1508. It is usually celebrated on 19 March, as the feast day of Saint Joseph, who is referred to as the fatherly Nutritor Domini ("Nourisher of the Lord") in Catholicism and "the putative father of Jesus" in southern European tradition. This celebration was brought to the Americas by the Spanish and Portuguese. The Catholic Church actively supported the custom of a celebration of fatherhood on St. Joseph's Day from either the last years of the 14th century or from the early 15th century, apparently on the initiative of the Franciscans.

In the Coptic Orthodox Church, the celebration of fatherhood is also observed on St Joseph's Day, but the Copts observe this on 20 July. The Coptic celebration may date back to the fifth century.

Whether to celebrate this day worldwide or not remained a debatable topic. In 1908, Grace Golden Clayton proposed the day to honor those men who had died in a mining accident in the US. Though it was not accepted then, in 1909 Sonora Smart Dodd, who along with her five brothers was raised by her father alone, after attending Mother's Day in a church, convinced the Spokane Ministerial Association to celebrate Father's Day worldwide.

In addition to Father's Day, International Men's Day is celebrated in many countries on 19 November in honor of both men and boys.

Dates

The following is a list of when Father's Day is celebrated, in order of date of observance.

African traditions

Algeria
In Algeria, the third Sunday in June is the dedicated day to celebrate the Father's Day.

Egypt
In Egypt, Father's Day is celebrated on 21 June of every year.

Kenya
In Kenya, Father's Day is celebrated on the third Sunday of June and is not a public holiday.

Morocco
In Morocco, the third Sunday in June is the dedicated day to celebrate the Father's Day.

Mozambique
In Mozambique, Father's Day is observed on 19 March every year.

Nigeria
In Nigeria, the third Sunday in June is the dedicated day to celebrate Father's Day.

Seychelles
In Seychelles, Father's Day is celebrated on 16 June and is not a public holiday.

South Africa
In South Africa, Father's Day is celebrated on the third Sunday of June. It is not a public holiday.

South Sudan
In South Sudan, Father's Day is celebrated on the last Monday of August. President Salva Kiir Mayardit proclaimed it before 27 August 2012. First celebrated on 27 August 2012, Father's Day was not celebrated in South Sudan in 2011 (due to the country's independence).

Sudan
In Sudan, Father's Day (عيد الأب), is celebrated on 21 June.

Asian traditions

Bangladesh
In Bangladesh there is no historical tradition of celebrating Father's Day (Bengali/Bangla: বাবা/আব্বু দিবস, Baba/abbu dibosh) and has been popularized by Western influences in the country. It is celebrated on the third Sunday of June, and is not a public holiday. Father's Day was not very popular and had been made more widespread by the Millennial and Generation Z communities all over the country through social media in recent times. Even though many religious families do not celebrate it, it is more widespread than ever. There is a popular phrase used by many parents: "Every day is father’s/mother's day, so you shall love your parents everyday." Most people just wish their father a happy father's day, but many people from big cities go to a restaurant to celebrate, and many even have cake. Many others cut cake at home or order food online. Some children may give small gifts to their father.

China
In the People's Republic of China, there is no official Father's Day. Some people celebrate on the third Sunday of June, according to the tradition of the United States. Father's Day is also celebrated in the special administrative regions. In Hong Kong, it is celebrated on the third Sunday of June and is not a public holiday. In Macau, Father's Day (Dia do Pai) is celebrated on the third Sunday of June and is not a public holiday.

India
Father's Day is not an original custom of India but is rather followed by the influence of the western world. It is observed on the third Sunday of June. This event is not a public holiday. The day is usually celebrated only in larger cities like Hyderabad, Chennai, Mumbai, Ahmedabad, New Delhi, Bengaluru, Kolkata, Pune and others. It is a huge holiday in the North Eastern state of Nagaland and Kerala where prayers are held in church on Sunday Services. After this day was first observed in the United States in 1908 and gradually gained popularity, Indian metropolitan cities, much later, followed suit by recognising this event. In India, the day is usually celebrated with children giving gifts such as greeting cards, electronic gadgets, shirts, gold necklaces, coffee mugs or books to their fathers.

Indonesia
In Indonesia, Father's Day is celebrated on 12 November and is not a public holiday. Father's Day in Indonesia was first declared in 2006 in Surakarta City Hall attended by hundreds of people from various community groups, including people from community of inter-religion communication. Because of its recent declaration, there is not much hype about the celebration, compared to the celebration of Mother's Day on 22 December. Google also created its doodle for Indonesia in 2019 and 2020.

Iran 
In Iran before the revolution, the 24th of Esfand, Reza Shah's birthday, was called Father's Day based on the Iranian calendar. After the revolution of 1957, this day was changed to the 13th of Rajab, the birthday of Ali bin Abi Talib, the first imam of Shiis. Zoroastrians also celebrate Shahrivargan as Father's Day.

Israel 
In Israel, Father's Day is usually celebrated as part of Family Day on 30 Shevat, though some celebrate on 1 May together with Workers' Day or Labor Day.

Japan
In Japan, Father's Day is celebrated on the third Sunday of June and is not a public holiday. Common presents are sake, shochu, fashion items, some kinds of gourmet food, sports equipment and various sweets.

Kazakhstan
Since 2012, Kazakhstan celebrates Defender of the Fatherland Day to commemorate the foundation of the armed forces. It is also called Army Day and it is celebrated on 7 May. Kazakh society perceives it as ‘a men’s day’ and honoring men so it is vaguely a celebration of fathers.

Malaysia
In Malaysia, Father's Day falls on the third Sunday of June.

Mongolia
The Mongolian Men's Association began the celebration of Father's Day on 8 August 2005.

Nepal

The Nepalese Hindus as well as the Newars in Nepal honors fathers on the day of Kushe aunsi, which occurs in late August or early September, depending on the year, since it depends on the lunar calendar. According to Hindu calendar, the festival falls on the new moon day of Bhadra month. It is also known as Gokarna Aunsi or Pitri Tirpani Aunsi.

In recent years, Nepalese non–Hindus have also adopted the Kushe Aunsi day. The celebration of the festival has been modernized in some ways in recent years. Children worship their father on this day, put tika on his forehead and give him sweets, delicacies and gifts as a part of celebration. In return, the father bless good fortune to his children.

On the new moon day (Amavasya), it is traditional to pay respect to one's deceased father; Hindus go to the Shiva temple of Gokarneswor Mahadev, in Gokarna, a suburb of Kathmandu while Buddhists go to Jana Bahal (Seto Machhendranath or white Tara) temple in Kathmandu.

Traditionally, in the Kathmandu Valley, the south-western corner is reserved for women and women-related rituals, and the north-eastern is for men and men-related rituals. The worship place for Mata Tirtha Aunsi ('Mother Pilgrimage New Moon') is located in Mata Tirtha in the south-western half of the valley, while the worship place for Gokarna Aunsi is located in the north-eastern half. This division is reflected in many aspects of the life in the Kathmandu Valley.

Pakistan
Father's Day is celebrated on the third Sunday of June. The Rutgers WPF launched a campaign titled 'Greening PakistanPromoting Responsible Fatherhood' on Father's Day (Sunday, 18 June 2017) across Pakistan to promote active fatherhood and responsibility for the care and upbringing of children. Father's Day is not a public holiday in Pakistan.

Philippines
In the Philippines, Father's Day is officially celebrated every third Sunday of June according to a recent presidential proclamation, but it is not a public holiday. It is more widely observed by the public on the third Sunday of June perhaps due to American influence and as proclaimed in 1988 by Philippine President Corazon Aquino.

Under Proclamation No. 58, series of 1998, issued by then Philippine President Joseph Ejercito Estrada, the first Monday of December of every year was designated as Mother's Day and Father's Day, expressly repealing the third Sunday of June observance.

Singapore
In Singapore, Father's Day is celebrated on the third Sunday of June but is not a public holiday.

South Korea
In South Korea, Parents' Day is celebrated on 8 May and is not a public holiday. Setting Parents' Day as a national holiday and holding a pan-national event is intended to inherit and develop traditional ethical standards such as filial piety and senior citizens' ideology. Regardless of age or gender, this day is also an opportunity to reaffirm that traditional filial piety is a crucial norm and cultural value in modern society. The ceremony to mark Parents' Day as an anniversary and put on carnations stems from a Christian culture. As Western religions and cultures entered, this holiday, which was introduced together, became the most traditional holiday combined with Confucian filial piety in the process of establishing itself.

Sri Lanka
Father's Day is observed on the third Sunday of June. It is not a public holiday. Many schools hold special events to honor fathers.

Taiwan

In Taiwan, Father's Day is not an official holiday, but is widely observed on 8 August, the eighth day of the eighth month of the year. In Mandarin Chinese, the pronunciation of the number eight is bā, and the pronunciation is very similar to the character  (bà), which means "pa" or "dad". The eighth day of the eighth month is a pun for dad. Taiwan, therefore, sometimes refer to 8 August as "Bābā Holiday" as a pun for "Dad's Holiday" or the more formal "Father's Day".

Thailand
In Thailand, Father's Day is observed on 5 December, the birthday of the late King Bhumibol Adulyadej (Rama IX). In Thailand, Father's Day, as well as Mother's Day, are national public holidays. Traditionally, Thais celebrate by giving their father or grandfather a canna flower, which is considered a masculine flower; however, this is not as commonly practiced today. Thai people will wear yellow on this day to show respect for the late king, because yellow is the color of the day for Monday, the day King Bhumibol Adulyadej was born. Thais flood the Sanam Luang, a massive park in front of the palace, to watch the king give his annual speech, and often stay until the evening when there is a national ceremony. Thais will light candles and show respect to the king by declaring their faith. This ceremony happens in almost every village in Thailand, and even overseas at Thai organizations.

It first gained nationwide popularity in the 1980s as part of a campaign by Prime Minister Prem Tinsulanonda to promote Thailand's royal family. Mother's Day is celebrated on the birthday of Queen Sirikit, 12 August.

United Arab Emirates
In the United Arab Emirates, Father's Day is celebrated on 21´June, generally coinciding with midsummer's day.

European traditions

Roman Catholicism 
In the Roman Catholic tradition, fathers are celebrated on Saint Joseph's Day (commonly called the Feast of Saint Joseph), 19 March, though in certain countries Father's Day has become a secular celebration. It is also common for Catholics to honor their "spiritual father", their parish priest, on Father's Day.

Austria
In Austria, Father's Day (Vatertag) is celebrated on the second Sunday of June and it is not a public holiday.

Belarus
In Belarus Father's Day is celebrated on 21 October.

Belgium
In Belgium, Father's Day (Vaderdag/Fête des Pères) is celebrated on the second Sunday of June or 14 June, and it is not a public holiday, except for Antwerp where it's celebrated on 19 March.

Bulgaria
In Bulgaria, Father's Day is celebrated on 26 December and it is not a public holiday. According to the Eastern Orthodox tradition, fathers are celebrated on Saint Joseph's Day - one day after Christmas.

Croatia
In Croatia, according to the Roman Catholic tradition, fathers are celebrated on Saint Joseph's Day (Dan svetog Josipa), 19 March. It is not a public holiday.

Denmark

In Denmark, Father's Day (Fars dag) is celebrated on 5 June. It coincides with Constitution Day.

Estonia
In Estonia, Father's Day (Isadepäev) is celebrated on the second Sunday of November. It is an established flag flying day and a national holiday.

Finland
In Finland, Father's Day is celebrated on the second Sunday of November. It is an established flag flying day.

France
In France lighter manufacturer Flaminaire introduced the idea of Father's Day first in 1949 for commercial reasons. Director Marcel Quercia wanted to sell their lighter in France. In 1950, they introduced "la Fête des Pères", which would take place every third Sunday of June (following the American example). Their slogan "Nos papas nous l'ont dit, pour la fête des pères, ils désirent tous un Flaminaire" (Our daddies told us, for Father's Day, they all want a Flaminaire). In 1952, the holiday was officially decreed. A national Father's Day committee was set up to give a prize for fathers who deserved it most (originally, candidates were nominated by the social services of each town hall's/mayor's office); This complements la Fête des Mères (Mother's Day) which was made official in France in 1928 and added to the calendar in Vichy in 1941.

Germany

In Germany, Father's Day (Vatertag) is celebrated differently from other parts of the world. It is always celebrated on Ascension Day (the Thursday forty days after Easter), which is a federal holiday. Regionally, it is also called gentlemen's day, Herrentag. It is a tradition for groups of males (young and old but usually excluding pre-teenage boys) to do a hiking tour with one or more smaller wagons, Bollerwagen, pulled by manpower. In the wagons are wine or beer bottles (according to the region) and traditional regional food, Hausmannskost. Many men use this holiday as an opportunity to get drunk. According to the Federal Statistical Office of Germany, alcohol-related traffic accidents treble on this day. The tradition of Father's Day is especially prevalent in Eastern Germany.

These traditions are probably rooted in Christian Ascension Day's processions to the farmlands, which has been celebrated since the 18th century. Men would be seated in a wooden cart and carried to the village's plaza, and the mayor would award a prize to the father who had the most children, usually with a big piece of ham. In the late 19th century the religious component was progressively lost, especially in urban areas such as Berlin, and groups of men organized walking excursions with beer and ham. By the 20th century, alcohol consumption had become a major part of the tradition. Many people will take the following Friday off work, and some schools are closed on that Friday as well; many people then use the resulting four-day-long weekend for a short vacation.

Greece

In Greece, Father's Day is officially celebrated on the third Sunday of June. The SYGAPA association, which supports the needs of divorced fathers, raises awareness and advocates for the father's role in society, also organizes various events on the day across the country.

Hungary
In Hungary, Father's Day is celebrated on the third Sunday of June and is not a public holiday.

Iceland
In Iceland, Father's Day is celebrated on the second Sunday of November.

Ireland
In Ireland, Father's Day is celebrated on the third Sunday of June and is not a public holiday.

Italy
In Italy, according to the Roman Catholic tradition, Father's Day is celebrated on Saint Joseph's Day, commonly called the Feast of Saint Joseph (Festa di San Giuseppe), 19 March. It was a public holiday until 1977.

Latvia
In Latvia, Father's Day (Tēvu diena) is celebrated on the second Sunday of September and is not a public holiday. In Latvia people did not always celebrate this day because of the USSR's influence with its own holidays. This day in Latvia was officially born in 2008 when it was celebrated and marked in the calendar for the first time on 14 September (second Sunday of September) to promote the idea that man as the father must be satisfied and proud of his family and children, also, the father is important to gratitude and loving words from his family for devoted to continuous altruistic concerns. Because this day is new to the country it does not have established unique traditions, but people borrow ideas from other countries' Father's Day traditions to congratulate fathers in Latvia.

Lithuania
In Lithuania, Father's Day (Tėvo diena) is celebrated on the first Sunday of June and is a public holiday.

Malta
Malta has followed the international trend and celebrates Father's Day on the third Sunday in June. As in the case of Mother's Day, the introduction of Father's Day celebrations in Malta was encouraged by Frans H Said (Uncle Frans of the children's radio programs). The first mention of Father's Day was in June 1977, and the day is now part of the local events calendar.

Netherlands
In the Netherlands (including its constituent countries in the Caribbean), Father's Day (Vaderdag) is celebrated on the third Sunday of June and is not a public holiday. Traditionally, as on Mother's Day, fathers get breakfast in bed made by their children and families gather together and have dinner, usually at the grandparents' house. In recent years, families also started having dinner out, and as on Mother's Day, it is one of the busiest days for restaurants. At school, children handcraft presents for their fathers. Consumer goods companies have all sorts of special offers for fathers: socks, ties, electronics, suits, and men's healthcare products.

Norway
In Norway, Father's Day (Farsdag), is celebrated on the second Sunday of November. It is not a public holiday.

Poland
In Poland, Father's Day is celebrated on 23 June and is not a public holiday. Google recognized Poland in its Father's Day 2019 Doodle.

Portugal
Father's Day (Dia do Pai) is celebrated on 19 March (see Roman Catholic tradition below) in Portugal. It is not a bank and public holiday.

Romania
The law instituting the celebration of Father's Day in Romania passed on 29 September 2009, and stated that Father's Day will be celebrated annually on the second Sunday of May. The first time it was celebrated was on 9 May 2010. This year it will be celebrated on 8 May .

Russia
Russia continues the Soviet Union's tradition of celebrating Defender of the Fatherland Day on 23 February. It is usually called "Man's Day" and it is considered the Russian equivalent of Father's Day. In 2021, the President of Russia established the Father's Day as falling on the third Sunday of October.

Slovakia
In Slovakia, Father's Day is celebrated on the third Sunday of June. It is not a public holiday.

Spain
Father's Day (El Día del Padre) is observed on the feast day of Saint Joseph, which is 19 March. It is celebrated as a public holiday in some regions of Spain.

Sweden
In Sweden, Father's Day (Fars dag), is celebrated on the second Sunday of November but is not a public holiday.

Turkey
In Turkey, Father's Day is celebrated on the third Sunday in June and is not a public holiday.

Ukraine
In Ukraine, Father's Day is celebrated on the third Sunday of June. It is not a public holiday.

United Kingdom
In the United Kingdom, Father's Day is celebrated on the third Sunday of June. The day does not have a long tradition; Steve Roud, in The English Year (2006), states that it entered British popular culture "sometime after the Second World War, not without opposition".

North American traditions

Canada
In Canada, Father's Day is celebrated on the third Sunday of June and is not a public holiday. Father's Day typically involves spending time with one's father or the father figures in one's life. Small family gatherings and the giving of gifts may be part of the festivities organized for Father's Day.

Costa Rica
In Costa Rica, the Social Christian Unity Party presented a bill to change the celebration of Father's Day from the third Sunday of June to 19 March, the day of Saint Joseph. That was to give tribute to this saint, who gave his name to the capital of the country San José, Costa Rica, so family heads will be able to celebrate Father's Day at the same time as the Feast of Saint Joseph the Worker. The official date is still the third Sunday of June.

Haiti
In Haiti, Father's Day (Fête des pères) is celebrated on the last Sunday of June and is not a public holiday. Fathers are recognized and celebrated on this day with cards, gifts, breakfast, lunch, brunch or early Sunday dinner; whether enjoying the day at the beach or mountains, spending family time or doing favorite activities.

Children exclaim "bonne fête papa", while everyone wishes all fathers "bonne Fête des Pères" (Happy Father's Day).

Mexico
In Mexico, Father's Day is celebrated on the third Sunday of June and is not a public holiday. Father's Day typically involves spending time with one's father or the father figures in one's life. Small family gatherings and the giving of gifts may be part of the festivities organized for Father's Day.

Trinidad and Tobago
In Trinidad and Tobago, Father's Day is celebrated on the third Sunday of June and is not a public holiday.

United States

In the US, Father's Day is celebrated on the third Sunday of June. Typically, families gather to celebrate the father figures in their lives. Schools (if in session) and other children's programs commonly have activities to make Father's Day gifts.

Oceanian traditions

Australia
In Australia, Father's Day is celebrated on the first Sunday of September, which is the first Sunday of spring in Australia. Most families present fathers with gifts and cards, and share a meal. It is not a public holiday.

The idea of Father's Day wasn't initially well received in Australia in the 1910s and 1920s. Many thought it was either unnecessary or undermined a father's assumed “supremacy” as head of the household. Newspapers at the time printed satirical poems and critical editorials of the new American tradition. Father's Day was originally observed in June, matching the USA date, with church services and the wearing of a red flower. In June 1925, Janet Heyden of Sydney (who also advocated for Mother's Day celebrations in Australia) began collecting donations to bring cheer to elderly men in nursing homes. While Mother's Day became instantly popular, it wasn't until the 1930s that Father's Day came to be popularly celebrated in Australia on the first Sunday in September. The Father's Day Council of Australia was established in 1957 and continues to honor distinguished fathers with an annual Australian Father of the Year award. Father's Day traditions in Australia include school crafts with handmade gifts and cards from younger children, taking dad out for lunch, BBQs, and outdoor family activities. Public schools often hold a Father's Day gift stall with inexpensive presents for fathers, grandfathers, carers, or other role-models.

YMCA Victoria continues the tradition of honoring the role fathers and father figures play in parenting through the annual awarding of Local Community Father of the Year in 32 municipalities in Victoria. The Father's Day Council of Victoria also annually recognizes fathers in the Victorian Father of the Year Award.

New Zealand
In New Zealand, Father's Day is celebrated on the first Sunday of September and it is not a public holiday. Father's Day was first observed at St Matthew's Church, Auckland on 14 July 1929 and first appeared in commercial advertising the following year. By 1931 other churches had adopted the day and in 1935 much of Australia moved to mark the day at the beginning of September. New Zealand followed this, with a Wellington advert in 1937 and a Christchurch Salvation Army service in 1938.

Samoa
In Samoa, Father's Day is celebrated on the second Sunday in August, and is a recognized national holiday on the Monday following.

Fiji
In Fiji, Father's Day is celebrated in September. Commercial fathers Sunday is usually on the first Sunday and then the Methodist Father's Day is usually celebrated on the second Sunday.

South American traditions

Argentina
Father's Day in Argentina is celebrated on the third Sunday of June.

Attempts have been made to change the date to 24 August, to commemorate the day on which the "Father of the Nation", José de San Martín, became a father. In 1953, the proposal to celebrate Father's Day in all educational establishments on 24 August, in honor of José de San Martín, was raised to the General Direction of Schools of Mendoza Province. The day was celebrated for the first time in 1958, on the third Sunday of June, but it was not included in the school calendars due to pressure from several groups.

Schools in the Mendoza Province continued to celebrate Father's Day on 24 August, and in 1982 the provincial governor passed a law declaring Father's Day in the province to be celebrated on that day.

In 2004, a proposal to change the date to 24 August was presented to the Argentine Chamber of Deputies as a single, unified project.

Bolivia
In Bolivia Father's Day (Día del padre, in Spanish) is celebrated on 19 March (Saint Joseph Day). People usually give a present to their fathers and spend time with them.

Brazil
In Brazil Father's Day (Dia dos Pais, in Portuguese) is celebrated three months after Mother's Day, on the second Sunday of August. Publicist Sylvio Bhering picked the day in honor of Saint Joachim, patron of fathers. While it is not an official holiday (see Public holidays in Brazil), it is widely observed and typically involves spending time with and giving gifts to one's father or father figure.

Chile
In Chile Father's Day (Día del padre, in Spanish) is officially celebrated on 19 June.

Colombia
In Colombia, Father's Day (Día del padre, in Spanish) is celebrated on the third Sunday of June. In 2022, it was officially celebrated on 26 June to avoid coinciding with the second round of the presidential elections.

Paraguay
In Paraguay, Father's Day is typically celebrated with a traditional banquet of Paraguayan food like chipa, mbeju, bori, soyo and sopa paraguaya. In Paraguay Father's Day is a very important day, and is celebrated with much fervor.

Peru
In Peru, Father's Day is celebrated on the third Sunday of June and is not a public holiday. People usually give a present to their fathers and spend time with them mostly during a family meal.

See also

 Grace Golden Clayton
 International Men's Day
 List of films set around Father's Day
 Mother's Day
 National Grandparents Day

References

Citations

General sources

External links

 

 
August observances
December observances
Holidays and observances by scheduling (nth weekday of the month)
July observances
June observances 
March observances
May observances
November observances 
Observances in the United States by presidential proclamation
October observances
September observances
Sunday observances
Finnish flag flying days
United States flag flying days
Men's events